This is a list of places named Peoria, which includes geographic name features such as populated places, geographical features, and post offices — including combined forms of the name, such as West Peoria, Illinois, and variations of the name, such as Paola, Kansas.

The original Peoria is found in Illinois. The largest Peoria (since 2010) is found in Arizona. Several places named Peoria are now just ghost towns found on old maps.

Peoria as a place name

The original Peoria (there are Indians still living who claim Peoria blood) were one of the principal tribes of the once-strong Illinois Confederation and had a language of the Algonquian family. The Algonquian nation had its ancient home north of the Great Lakes, whence the Peoria probably split off and drifted down the Mississippi Valley. Most places named Peoria derive — or probably derive — from the Peoria tribe of Indians. A few may owe their existence to settlers from Peoria, Illinois.

Canada

Alberta

Populated places and locales

 Peoria — named for Peoria, Illinois — P.O. (?)

United States of America

Arizona

Populated places and locales

 Peoria (Maricopa County) — named for Peoria, Illinois, by settlers from there — P.O. 4 August 1888 to date

Streets

 Peoria Avenue — Phoenix metropolitan area

Education districts and facilities

Peoria Unified School District
Peoria High School
Peoria Elementary School

Arkansas

Populated places and locales

 Peoria (Sebastian County) — P.O. 30 April 1878 to 31 December 1915 (mail to Mansfield)

California

Geographical features

 Peoria Basin (Tuolumne County) — geographical feature
 Peoria Creek (Tuolumne County) — geographical feature
 Peoria Mountain (Tuolumne County) — geographical feature
 Peoria Pass (Tuolumne County) — geographical feature

Other classes of features

 Peoria Bar (Plumas County) — gold-mine camp
 Peoria Bar (Tuolumne County) — gold-mine camp
 Peoria Flat (Tuolumne County) — gold-mine camp
 Peoria House (Yuba County) — stage stop
 Peoria House (Yuba County) — school district
 Peoria House (Yuba County) — cemetery

Colorado

Populated places and locales

 Peoria (Arapahoe County) — P.O. 5 March 1906 to 15 January 1914 (mail to Byers)

Streets

 Peoria Street (?) — Denver

Florida

Populated places and locales

 Peoria (Clay County) — P.O. 18 September 1886 to 30 January 1932 (mail to Doctors Inlet)

Geographical features

 Peoria Point (Clay County) — cape

Illinois

Populated places and locales

 East Peoria (Tazewell County) — [1] P.O. "Little Detroit" 20 September 1833 to 1 September 1836; Reestablished 15 May 1848 to 23 October 1863 (to East Peoria); P.O. "East Peoria" 23 October 1863 to 3 June 1867 (to Little Detroit); P.O. "Little Detroit" 3 June 1867 to 4 April 1871. [2] P.O. "East Peoria" 25 January 1886 to 11 November 1886 (mail to Peoria). [3] P.O. "Hilton" 11 April 1870 to 2 November 1889 (to East Peoria); P.O. "East Peoria" 2 November 1889 to 26 October 1900 (mail to Peoria).
 Lower Peoria (Peoria County)
 North Peoria (Peoria County) — P.O. 26 April 1886 to 4 August 1898 (mail to Peoria)
 Peoria (Peoria County) — settled 1730 — P.O. 8 March 1823 to date
 Peoriaville (Peoria County) — P.O. for Newburgh (not contiguous with Peoria) — P.O. 27 February 1850 to 12 February 1855
 Peoria District Junction (Logan County) — junction of PL&D RR and St. Louis RR — RFD Lincoln
 Peoria Gardens (Peoria County)
 Peoria Heights (Peoria County)
 Peoria Junction (McLean County) — now named Chenoa
 Peoria Junction (Peoria County) — CRI&P RR — RFD Peoria
 Peoria Mills (Peoria County)
 South Peoria (Peoria County)
 South East Peoria (Tazewell County) — addition to East Peoria
 West Peoria (Peoria County)

Civil features

 Peoria County
 Peoria Township (Peoria County)

Geographical features

 Peoria Lake — section of Illinois River

Streets

 Peoria Street — Springfield
 Peoria Street — Chicago
 Peoria Avenue — Peoria
 Peoria Street — Lincoln

Indiana

Populated places and locales

 Peoria (Franklin County) — same as Peoria (Butler County) Ohio — named for Peoria Indians — reportedly had alternate name of "Ingleside" — P.O. 5 May 1837 to 15 January 1858; Reestablished 17 April 1872 to 8 February 1876; Reestablished 11 April 1876 to 15 February 1889 (mail to Reily, Ohio); Reestablished 7 February 1891 to 2 January 1907 (mail to Oxford, Ohio)
 Peoria (Miami County) — named for Peoria, Illinois, by settlers from the East who had intended to settle in Peoria, but stopped — P.O. "Reserve"
 Peoria Junction (Cass County)

Iowa

Populated places and locales

 Peoria (Mahaska County) — P.O. "Warrensville" 16 August 1849 to 15 November 1854 (to Peoria); P.O. "Peoria" 15 November 1854 to 15 January 1906 (mail to Pella)
 Peoria (Wayne County) — P.O. "Samville" 28 July 1886 to 11 March 1887 (to Bentonville); P.O. "Bentonville" 11 March 1887 to 2 July 1895 — town renamed "Bentonville"; now defunct
 Peoria City (Polk and Story counties) — "Peoria" on some maps — platted in Polk County — P.O. 8 May 1856 to 5 April 1883 (Polk County)

Populated places and locales — variant spellings

 Peiro (Woodbury County) — reportedly a linguistic variation of "Peoria" — P.O. 6 November 1877 to 30 June 1904

Kansas

Populated places and locales

 Peoria (Franklin County) — P.O "Pioria" 15 June 1857 to 26 July 1860; "Peoria" 27 July 1860 to 30 April 1934 (mail to Ottawa)
 Peoria Village — now Paola (Miami County) — named for Peoria Indians (but see Paola, below) — P.O. ?
 "Peoria" — proposed name for Osawatomie (Miami County)

Populated places and locales — variant spellings

 Paola (Miami County) — formerly Peoria Village — named for Baptiste Peoria, a leader of the Peoria Indians — linguistic variation of "Peoria" — P.O. "Paola" (late Peoria Village) 13 February 1856 to date

Civil features

 Peoria Township (Franklin County)
 Paola Township (Miami County)

Kentucky

Populated places and locales — variant spellings

 Peolia (Washington County) — relationship to "Peoria" not determined

Minnesota

 Peoria (Todd County) — P.O. 1883 to 1886

Mississippi

Populated places and locales

 Peoria (Amite County) — original P.O. "Robinson" — P.O. "Peoria" 15 July 1904 to 22 June 1962 (mail to Liberty)

Missouri

Populated places and locales

 Peoria (Bates County) — probably named for Peoria Indians — P.O. 22 June 1859 to 15 April 1863; Reestablished 31 July 1867 to 29 June 1869
 Peoria (Washington County) — named for Peoria, Illinois, from list of names suggested by Post Office Department — probably existed as P.O. only — P.O. 24 April 1908 to 19 September 1934 (mail to Bismarck)

Geographical features

 Peola Branch (Reynolds County) — stream — linguistic variation of "Peoria"

Nebraska

Populated places and locales

 Peoria (Knox County) — P.O. 9 Nov 1883 to 3 Aug 1893 (mail to Bloomfield)

Civil features

 Peoria Township (Knox County)

Populated places and locales — variant spellings

 Peora (Richardson County) — relationship to "Peoria" not determined

New Mexico

Other classes of features

 Peoria Tank — reservoir

New York

Populated places and locales

 Peoria (Albany County) — different name before "Peoria" — name changed to "West Berne" — no P.O. as "Peoria"
 Peoria (Wyoming County) — P.O. 3 February 1842 to 15 August 1911 (mail to Pavilion)

North Carolina

Populated places and locales

 Peoria (Watauga County) — P.O. 9 January 1903 to 31 May 1938 (mail to Reese)

Streets

 Peoria Road (Watauga County)

Ohio

Populated places and locales

 Peoria (Butler County) — same as Peoria (Franklin County) Indiana — no P.O. in Ohio
 Peoria (Union County) — P.O. 26 September 1872 to 11 August 1967 (mail to Columbus)

Streets

 Peoria-Reily Road (Butler County)
 Peoria Loop Road (Union County)

Oklahoma

Populated places and locales

 Peoria (Beaver County) — named for Peoria, Illinois — P.O. 1 March 1890 to 29 April 1891
 Peoria (Ottawa County) — located on Peoria Reservation — originally a mining camp — P.O. 18 January 1897 to 29 November 1941 (mail to Baxter Springs, Kansas)

Civil features

 Peoria Township (Ottawa County)

Streets

 Peoria Street — Miami
 Peoria Street — Tulsa

Oregon

Populated places and locales

 Peoria (Linn County) — probably named for "Peoria Party" of settlers which left Peoria, Illinois, in May 1839 — P.O. "Burlington" 17 November 1853 to 7 November 1857 (to Peoria); P.O. "Peoria" 7 November 1857 to 10 August 1900 (mail to Shedds; name changed to "Shedd" 13 November 1915)

South Dakota

Populated places and locales

 Peoria Bottom (or Bottoms) (Hughes County) — named for steamboat named Peoria, which went aground there — no P.O.

Civil features

 Peoria Township (Hughes County)

Geographical features

 Peoria Bottom (or Bottoms) (Hughes County) — name changed to Peoria Flat - geographical feature
 Peoria Flat (Hughes County) — formerly Peoria Bottom (or Bottoms) — geographical feature

Texas

Populated places and locales

 Peoria (Hill County) — named for Peoria, Illinois, by a settler from there — P.O. 3 October 1856 to 5 November 1866; Reestablished 13 February 1867 to 15 December 1907 (mail to Hillsboro)

Other instances
  — ship

See also

Peoria (disambiguation)
Will it play in Peoria?

References

Sources

 Scheetz, George H. "Peoria". In Place Names in the Midwestern United States. Edited by Edward Callary. (Studies in Onomastices; 1.) Mellen Press, 2000. 
 U.S. Board on Geographic Names

Peoria
Peoria